Langvatnet is a lake that lies in Fauske Municipality in Nordland county, Norway. The village of Sulitjelma lies on the northeastern edge of the lake. Water from the lakes Kjelvatnet and Låmivatnet flow into the lake from the south and east. The water from Langvatnet flows out through the Sjønstå River to the west towards the lake Øvrevatnet.

See also
 List of lakes in Norway
 Geography of Norway

References

Lakes of Nordland
Fauske